Chlorophthalmus is a genus of greeneyes

Species
There are currently 17 recognized species in this genus:
 Chlorophthalmus acutifrons Hiyama, 1940 (Greeneye)
 Shortnose greeneye (Chlorophthalmus agassizi) Bonaparte, 1840 (Shortnose greeneye)
 Chlorophthalmus albatrossis D. S. Jordan & Starks, 1904
 Chlorophthalmus atlanticus Poll, 1953 (Atlantic greeneye)
 Chlorophthalmus borealis Kuronuma & M. Yamaguchi, 1941 
 Chlorophthalmus brasiliensis Mead, 1958
 Chlorophthalmus corniger Alcock, 1894 
 Chlorophthalmus chalybeius Goode, 1881
 Chlorophthalmus ichthyandri Kotlyar & Parin, 1986
 Chlorophthalmus mascarensis Kobyliansky, 2013 
 Chlorophthalmus mento Garman, 1899
 Chlorophthalmus nigromarginatus Kamohara, 1953 (Blackedge greeneye)
 Chlorophthalmus pectoralis Okamura & M. Doi, 1984
 Chlorophthalmus proridens C. H. Gilbert & Cramer, 1897
 Chlorophthalmus punctatus Gilchrist, 1904 (Spotted greeneye)
 Chlorophthalmus vityazi Kobyliansky, 2013 
 Chlorophthalmus zvezdae Kotlyar & Parin, 1986

References

Chlorophthalmidae
Marine fish genera
Taxa named by Charles Lucien Bonaparte